Biton is a Hebrew surname common among Israeli Morrocan-Jews, originated from Spain.

Biton may also refer to:

 AS Biton, Malian football club
 Biton, Burkina Faso
 Biton of Pergamon, an ancient Greek writer of the Hellenistic period on war and siege machines
 Kleobis and Biton, the two Argive brothers given as examples of a happy life in History of Herodotus
 Biton (arachnid), a genus of spider in family Daesiidae